The Korg Mono/Poly (MP-4) is a 44 key "mono-polyphonic" analog synthesizer manufactured by Korg from 1981 to 1984. This keyboard is the sister synthesizer to the Korg Polysix.  It has four highly stable voltage-controlled oscillators (VCOs), a 4-pole, self-oscillating low pass filter (LPF), wide modulation capabilities and pseudo-polyphony (paraphony).

Audio Architecture

Four voltage-controlled oscillators (VCOs) and a noise source are routed through a voltage-controlled filter (VCF) and voltage-controlled amplifier (VCA).  It can be used as 1) a four-oscillator mono synth; 2) a four-voice paraphonic synth, with voices cycling through oscillators but sharing a VCF and VCA; 3) a shared mode using mono mode for single notes, dual oscillators per note for double notes, otherwise paraphonic mode; 4) a chord memory which results in a mono synth albeit with four oscillators playing notes of up to a four-note chord. 

The four VCOs have controls for independent tuning, footage (16, 8, 4, 2), waveshape (triangle, saw, pulse-width, and pulse-width modulated), and amplitude.  These are implemented with SSM2033 chips.  Portamento may be used for VCO frequency.  The noise source has a level control. 

The single VCF is a 24/dB octave low-pass filter, with controls for cutoff, resonance, scaling, and invertible envelope control.  It can self-oscillate, and be scaled 1:1 with frequency, and thus used as a fifth oscillator.  It is implemented with the SSM2044 chip. 

There are two envelopes.  One is dedicated solely to the VCA.  The second in nominally the "VCF envelope" but can additionally control VCO pulse-width, all VCO's pitch, pitch only of VCO's 2 and 4, and frequency modulation amount.  The envelopes share controls for single or multiple trigger, and damping. 

There are two low-frequency oscillators (LFOs), called "Modulation Generators" (MGs) by Korg.  The first has control over waveform and speed, and can be routed to VCO pitch or pulse-width, VCF cutoff, and frequency modulation amount.  When controlling VCO pitch, it can control all VCOs; VCO 1; VCO 2, 3, and 4; or VCO 2 and 4. The second only has a control for speed, and can control the arpeggiator or VCO pulse-width. 

There is an arpeggiator with on/off/latch control, up/down/up-down pitch control, and 1/2/full keyboard control. 

The Mono/Poly includes extensive and significant modulation capabilities between the oscillators, grouped in a section captioned "Effects."  These include the abilities to: 1) sync VCO's 2, 3, and 4 to VCO 1; 2) sync VCO 2 to 1, and 4 to 3; 3) to frequency-modulate VCOs 2, 3, and 4 with VCO 1; 4) frequency-modulate VCO 2 with 1 and 4 with 3.  Oscillator sync and frequency modulation can be used together.  This ability to have 1 master with 3 slave oscillators, or 2 each, is leveraged by the bewildering variety of oscillator subsets that can be controlled with modulation sources and wheel controls. 

External inputs and outputs are provided for CV/Trigger, VCF and VCO mod inputs, arpeggiator, and portamento.  The pitch bend and mod wheel can be assigned to control pitch of all VCOs; VCO 1 only; VCO 2, 3, and 4; or VCO 2 and 4.  The pitch bend range extends to 2.5 octaves for VCO pitch, and the audio range for VCF cutoff.

Usability

The main drawback of the Mono/Poly is that the 4 VCOs share one common VCA and VCF envelope, like all the knobby monophonic synthesizers like MiniMoog, but there are triggering and auto-dampening switches to compensate for the envelope sharing. This synth was not so much designed to be a polysynth like its sister the Polysix (which was manufactured at the same time), but more of an experimental synth with different footages and waveshapes per oscillator. The Mono/Poly also did not include a digital memory like its sister the Polysix, because its focus was again on experimentation.  

The chipboard construction on the base and sides of the unit tend to get damaged easily or allow screws to come out.  The rubber contacts under the keyboard tend to wear over time resulting in dead keys.  This may be fixed with a little cleaning and/or obtaining a new rubber strip, as Mono/Polys are fairly easy to disassemble. Circuit reliability is good by the standard of analog synths. The most likely component to fail is generally one of the 4 VCOs.  The next to go is usually the filter.

The Mono/Poly can be used as a rhythm machine, by setting the instrument in 'Poly' and setting the different footages of the oscillators and the different waveshapes, and then using the frequency modulators with the arpeggiator; adjust the envelopes accordingly to percussive settings and fiddle with the cut-off and noise from time to time to add tone color, and finally, set the LFO to pitch and set it at a considerable amplitude. 

Further, the pedal inputs can be routed from synths like the Korg MS-20 so that external oscillators can further modulate above what's already available. Because the VCOs have separate tuning controls they tend to be slightly out of tuning phase no matter how well they're tuned; to play chords that are in direct tuning phase, play the notes in a rapid, descending order from high to low. Like most analog synthesizers, it tends to scale better from high to low than low to high.

Later Developments

The Mono/Poly is reproduced by Korg for its software-based Legacy Collection. It can be used as a Virtual Studio Technology (VST) in common Digital audio workstations or as a stand-alone synth with any compatible PC or Mac product. More recently, KORG introduced a mobile iOS application for iPad (iMono/Poly), which faithfully reproduces the dynamics of the original.

Notable Users
 Vince Clarke/Depeche Mode "It's like playing 4 cheap synthesizers at once," said Vince Clarke.
 MGMT, who cite it as their favorite synthesizer.
 Fin Leavell, who uses it in bands The Summer Obsession and Nightswim.

References

Further reading

Mono poly
Analog synthesizers
Polyphonic synthesizers
Musical instruments invented in the 1980s